Ceratoxanthis is a genus of moths belonging to the family Tortricidae.

Species
Ceratoxanthis adriatica Elsner & Jaro, 2003
Ceratoxanthis argentomixtana (Staudinger, 1871)
Ceratoxanthis externana (Eversmann, 1844)
Ceratoxanthis iberica Baixeras, 1992
Ceratoxanthis rakosyella Wieser & Huemer, 2000
Ceratoxanthis saratovica Trematerra, 2010

See also
List of Tortricidae genera

References

 , 2005: World Catalogue of Insects vol. 5 Tortricidae.
 , 1960, Polskie Pismo Ent. 30: 30.
 , 2011: Diagnoses and remarks on genera of Tortricidae, 2: Cochylini (Lepidoptera: Tortricidae). Shilap Revista de Lepidopterologia 39 (156): 397–414.
 , 2010: Lepidoptera Tortricidae from SE European Russia with description of Ceratoxanthis saratovica sp. n. Journal of Entomological and Acarological Research Serie II 42 (1): 19–26.

External links
tortricidae.com

Cochylini
Tortricidae genera